The 1982 World Fencing Championships were held in Rome, Italy. The event took place from July 15 to July 24, 1982.

Medal table

Medal summary

Men's events

Women's events

References

FIE Results

World Fencing Championships
World Fencing Championships
World Fencing Championships
1980s in Rome
International fencing competitions hosted by Italy
1982 in fencing
July 1982 sports events in Europe